Two-Piece Reclining Figure No. 9 is a bronze sculpture of 1967 by the English artist Henry Moore, which exists in several versions and is catalogued as LH 576.

Locations
Casts are located at the National Library of Australia, in Canberra, the Norton Simon Museum in Pasadena, California, the Lynden Sculpture Garden near Milwaukee, Wisconsin, and the Kansas City Sculpture Park.

Description
The bronze sculpture is an abstract, androgynous reclining form; it rests on a base installed on the lawn.

See also
List of sculptures by Henry Moore
Reclining Figure 1969–70
Two-Piece Reclining Figure: Points

References

Outdoor sculptures in Milwaukee
1967 sculptures
Sculptures by Henry Moore
Bronze sculptures in the United States